Ragnar Graeffe (16 September 1929 – 28 August 2005) was a Finnish sprinter. He competed in the men's 4 × 400 metres relay at the 1952 Summer Olympics.

References

1929 births
2005 deaths
Athletes (track and field) at the 1952 Summer Olympics
Finnish male sprinters
Finnish male hurdlers
Olympic athletes of Finland
Place of birth missing